The Baybiche Too (or Baybichetoo) is a mountain range in the central Tien-Shan separating the Middle Naryn and Atbashi valleys. The range runs 140 km along its axis with the highest elevation at 4,337 m. The range is composed of uplifted Paleozoic limestones, schists, and granites.

References

Mountain ranges of Kyrgyzstan